Alyssa Spellman is an American beauty pageant contestant who was crowned Miss New Hampshire 2004. She had previously placed first runner-up two times before placing winning the state pageant.

She did not make it into the Top 10 of the Miss America 2005 contest but did win a Non-finalist Interview Award. The pageant was won by Miss Alabama, Deidre Downs.

Spellman was national 1st runner-up to Miss America's Children's Champion; nationally she raised the second-highest amount of funds among Miss America contestants for the Children's Miracle Network.

References

External links
Miss New Hampshire official website
Miss America official website

Married then divorced Jon Allen Herb .
Currently married to Benjamin Glenn

Living people
Year of birth missing (living people)
Place of birth missing (living people)
American beauty pageant winners
Miss America 2005 delegates
People from Derry, New Hampshire